UKSC may refer to:
United Kingdom Space Command
Supreme Court of the United Kingdom
UK Strength Council, a British sport governing body for strongmen competitions
UK Space Conference